Macellopis is a genus of moths of the family Erebidae. The genus was erected by George Hampson in 1926.

Species
Macellopis plantei Laporte, 1974 Cameroon, Central African Republic
Macellopis ustata Hampson, 1926 southern Nigeria

References

Calpinae